The Sahara Bank is a Libyan commercial bank, established in 1964. The bank performs retail and corporate banking operations and its head office is located in Tripoli.

History
The Sahara Bank was established in 1964, as subsidiary of Banco di Sicilia. 

On 22 December 1970, a law was passed that demanded that all the foreign banks shares be nationalized and became completely owned by Libya. As of 1991, the principal shareholder was Central Bank of Libya with 82 per cent and Libyan Interests with the rest of 18 per cent. The bank had 751 employees in its roles. The head office of the bank was located in Libya's capital, Tripoli. The bank was counted as one of the ten major banks under the control of Central Bank of Libya. 

In July 2007, France's BNP Paribas acquired 19 per cent share of the Sahara bank. It also became the major shareholder and took over the operations. BNP pulled out of the operations of the bank in 2011, following revolutions in Libya.

Operations
The bank performs retail and commercial banking operations and also offers international trade centre services. It also facilities mass payments, POS payments, treasury services, car leasing, Islamic Banking and Italian desk services. The bank provides fund transfer services like international transfers and treasury services to its corporate clients.

References

Banks of Libya
Banks established in 1964
BNP Paribas
Economy of Tripoli, Libya